The Life Scientific is a BBC Radio 4 science programme, presented by Jim Al-Khalili, in which each episode is dedicated to the biography and work of a living scientist.
The programme consists of an interview between Al-Khalili and the featured scientist, with others contributing anecdotes.

TIt is broadcast on Tuesday mornings in the UK, and is available online and via BBC Sounds, as is an archive of past episodes. There have been over 200  episodes since the first, an interview with Sir Paul Nurse . In October 2021 the programme reached its 10-year anniversary with discussion between  Ottoline Leyser, Paul Nurse, Christopher Jackson and Sue Black about what makes a scientist a scientist.

Guests 

Guests have included:

References

External links

BBC Radio 4 programmes
Science radio programmes
2011 radio programme debuts